Robert Steel may refer to:

Robert Steel (minister) (1827–1893), Scottish/Australian Presbyterian minister
Robert Steel (chess player) (1839-1903), English chess player and businessman
Bobby Steel (1888–1972), Scottish footballer
Robert Walter Steel (1915–1997), professor of geography at Liverpool University and principal of the University College of Swansea
Robert K. Steel (born 1951), president and CEO of Wachovia Corporation

See also
Robert Steele (disambiguation)